Thébault may refer to:

13775 Thébault, main belt asteroid with an orbital period of 4.39 years
Alain Thébault (born 1962), French yachtsman
Jacques Thébault (1924–2015), French comedian and voice actor
Victor Thébault (1882–1960), French mathematician best known for propounding three problems in geometry
Thébault's theorem, a geometry problem he proposed
Thébault, Dutch variant of Rugby football